Michael Baraza Nyongesa (born 17 March 1979) is a Kenyan footballer who currently plays for Kenyan Premier League club Western Stima as a striker.

Career

Club career
Baraza began his club football career with A.F.C. Leopards in 2001, before moving to Nzoia Sugar the following year and then Ulinzi Stars in 2003. In 2006, he moved to Malaysia to play for PDRM FA and travelled to Tanzania the following year to play for Simba. He moved to Azam in 2008 and then rejoined Ulinzi Stars in 2010. He then joined A.F.C. Leopards in July 2011, where he was named the club's Player of the Year in 2012 after leading his club with nine goals during the 2012 Kenyan Premier League season. He retired at the end of the 2013 season. However, on 21 June 2015, it was announced that Baraza made a return to professional football, signing a six-month contract with Western Stima.

International career
Baraza made several appearances for the Kenya national football team and participated in 2012 Africa Cup of Nations qualification. He was also a part of the squad that finished second in the 2012 CECAFA Cup, playing the full 90 minutes as his nation fell to a 2–1 to hosts Uganda in the final.

Personal life
Baraza's father, Sammy Nyongesa, is a former Kenya international footballer and manager.

References

External links

 Mike Baraza at Goal.com

1979 births
Living people
Kenyan footballers
Kenya international footballers
A.F.C. Leopards players
PDRM FA players
Simba S.C. players
Azam F.C. players
Western Stima F.C. players
Association football forwards
Tanzanian Premier League players